Stegnevskaya is a rural locality (a village) in Kargopolsky District, Arkhangelsk Oblast, Russia. The population was 21 as of 2012. There is 1 street.

Geography 
Stegnevskaya is located 35 km east of Kargopol (the district's administrative centre) by road. Lazarevskaya is the nearest rural locality.

References 

Rural localities in Kargopolsky District